Last December may refer to:

 "Last December", song by Prince from The Rainbow Children
 "Last December", song by Letters from the Fire from Worth the Pain
 "Last December", song by Nina Nesbitt from The Sun Will Come Up, the Seasons Will Change
 "Last December", song by Iced Earth from Burnt Offerings

See also 
 December (disambiguation)
 "Back to December", song by Taylor Swift